Dexter Daniels may refer to:
 Dexter Daniels (American football) (1973–), American football linebacker
 Dexter Daniels (Aboriginal activist) (1932–c. 1990), Australian Aboriginal activist